John Francis Meagher (born 17 September 1948 in Melbourne, Australia) is an Australian Racing Hall of Fame Thoroughbred racehorse trainer.

He is a Melbourne Cup winning trainer who relocated to Singapore from Melbourne in 1999. Meagher trained What A Nuisance to a win in the 1985 Melbourne Cup. Ridden by Pat Hyland and owned by Lloyd Williams the win was particularly memorable for the attendance of Prince Charles and Lady Diana who presented the winning connections with the famous trophy. It was also the first Melbourne Cup to offer $1,000,000 in prize money.

Meagher was inducted into the Australian Racing Hall of Fame in 2019.

Group wins in Singapore

Group 1's

Group 2's

Group 3's

References

 Trainer profiles at STC- 
 Statistics at STC-

External links
Official site

Living people
Horse trainers from Melbourne
1948 births